Romana Vyňuchalová (born 3 September 1986) is a Slovak basketball player for ŠBK Šamorín and the Slovak national team.

She participated at the EuroBasket Women 2017.

References

1986 births
Living people
Slovak women's basketball players
Sportspeople from Bratislava
Centers (basketball)